Stonehenge is a rural locality in the Toowoomba Region, Queensland, Australia. In the  Stonehenge had a population of 27 people.

History
The locality was named after a relatively small pastoral run established by Herbert Evans in the 1840s. The name relates to rock formations near the homestead.

Stonehenge was opened for selection on 17 April 1877;  were available.

In the  Stonehenge had a population of 27 people.

References

Toowoomba Region
Localities in Queensland